Edremit may refer to: 

 Edremit, Balıkesir, a district and city in Balıkesir Province, Turkey 
 Edremit, Van, a district and city in Van Province, Turkey 
 Edremit, the Turkish name for Trimithi, Cyprus
 Edremit (olive), a cultivar of the olive tree